Luminism may refer to

Luminism (American art style), a current in North American painting
Light art
Luminism (Impressionism), a neo-impressionist style in painting